A  ("way to act". pl. مَذَاهِب) is a school of thought within fiqh (Islamic jurisprudence).

The major Sunni Madhhab are Hanafi, Maliki, Shafi'i and Hanbali. They emerged in the ninth and tenth centuries CE and by the twelfth century almost all jurists aligned themselves with a particular madhhab. These four schools recognize each other's validity and they have interacted in legal debate over the centuries. Rulings of these schools are followed across the Muslim world without exclusive regional restrictions, but they each came to dominate in different parts of the world. For example, the Maliki school is predominant in North and West Africa; the Hanafi school in South and Central Asia; the Shafi'i school in East Africa and Southeast Asia; and the Hanbali school in North and Central Arabia. The first centuries of Islam also witnessed a number of short-lived Sunni madhhabs. The Zahiri school, which is considered to be endangered, continues to exert influence over legal thought. The development of Shia legal schools occurred along the lines of theological differences and resulted in the formation of the Twelver, Zaidi and Ismaili madhhabs, whose differences from Sunni legal schools are roughly of the same order as the differences among Sunni schools. The Ibadi legal school, distinct from Sunni and Shia madhhabs, is predominant in Oman. Unlike Sunnis, Shias, and Ibadis, non-denominational Muslims are not affiliated with any madhhab.

The transformations of Islamic legal institutions in the modern era have had profound implications for the madhhab system. With the spread of codified state laws in the Muslim world, the influence of the madhhabs beyond personal ritual practice depends on the status accorded to them within the national legal system. State law codification commonly drew on rulings from multiple madhhabs, and legal professionals trained in modern law schools have largely replaced traditional ulama as interpreters of the resulting laws. In the 20th century, many Islamic jurists began to assert their intellectual independence from traditional madhhabs. With the spread of Salafi influence and reformist currents in the 20th century; many  Sunni scholars have asserted independence from being strictly bound by the legal mechanisms of the four schools. Nevertheless, many of scholarship continues to uphold post-classical creedal belief in rigorously adhering (Taqlid) to one of the four schools in all legal details.

The Amman Message, which was endorsed in 2005 by prominent Islamic scholars around the world, recognized four Sunni schools (Hanafi, Maliki, Shafi'i, Hanbali), two Shia schools (Ja'fari, Zaidi), the Ibadi school and the Zahiri school. The Muslim schools of jurisprudence are located in Pakistan, Iran, Bangladesh, India, Indonesia, Nigeria, Egypt, Turkey, Afghanistan, Kazakhstan, Russia, China, the Philippines, Algeria, Libya, Saudi Arabia and multiple other countries.

"Ancient" schools 
According to John Burton, "modern research shows" that fiqh was first "regionally organized" with "considerable disagreement and variety of view". In the second century of Islam, schools of fiqh were noted for the loyalty of their jurists to the legal practices of their local communities, whether Mecca, Kufa, Basra, Syria, etc. (Egypt's school in Fustat was a branch of Medina's school of law and followed such practices—up until the end of the 8th century—as basing verdict on one single witness (not two) and the oath of the claimant. Its principal jurist in the second half of the 8th century was al-Layth b. Sa'd.) Al-Shafiʽi wrote that, "every capital of the Muslims is a seat of learning whose people follow the opinion of one of their countrymen in most of his teachings". The "real basis" of legal doctrine in these "ancient schools" was not a body of reports of Muhammad's sayings, doings, silent approval (the ahadith) or even those of his Companions, but the "living tradition" of the school as "expressed in the consensus of the scholars", according to Joseph Schacht.

Al-Shafi‘i and after 
It has been asserted that madhahib were consolidated in the 9th and 10th centuries as a means of excluding dogmatic theologians, government officials and non-Sunni sects from religious discourse. Historians have differed regarding the times at which the various schools emerged. One interpretation is that Sunni Islam was initially split into four groups: the Hanafites, Malikites, Shafi'ites and Zahirites. Later, the Hanbalites and Jarirites developed two more schools; then various dynasties effected the eventual exclusion of the Jarirites; eventually, the Zahirites were also excluded when the Mamluk Sultanate established a total of four independent judicial positions, thus solidifying the Maliki, Hanafi, Shafi'i and Hanbali schools. During the era of the Islamic Gunpowders, the Ottoman Empire reaffirmed the official status of these four schools as a reaction to Shi'ite Persia.
Some are of the view that Sunni jurisprudence falls into two groups: Ahl al-Ra'i ("people of opinions", emphasizing scholarly judgment and reason) and Ahl al-Hadith ("people of traditions", emphasizing strict interpretation of scripture).

10th century Shi'ite scholar Ibn al-Nadim named eight groups: Maliki, Hanafi, Shafi'i, Zahiri, Imami Shi'ite, Ahl al-Hadith, Jariri and Kharijite. In the 12th century Jariri and Zahiri schools were absorbed by the Shafi'i and Hanbali schools respectively. Ibn Khaldun defined only three Sunni madhahib: Hanafi, Zahiri, and one encompassing the Shafi'i, Maliki and Hanbali schools as existing initially, noting that by the 14th-century historian the Zahiri school had become extinct, only for it to be revived again in parts of the Muslim world by the mid-20th century.

Historically, the fiqh schools were often in political and academic conflict with one another, vying for favor with the ruling government in order to have their representatives appointed to legislative and especially judiciary positions. Geographer and historian Al-Muqaddasi once satirically categorized competing madhahib with contrasting personal qualities: Hanafites, highly conscious of being hired for official positions, appeared deft, well-informed, devout and prudent; Malikites, dull and obtuse, confined themselves to observance of prophetic tradition; Shafi'ites were shrewd, impatient, understanding and quick-tempered; Zahirites haughty, irritable, loquacious and well-to-do; Shi'ites, entrenched and intractable in old rancor, enjoyed riches and fame; and Hanbalites, anxious to practice what they preached, were charitable and inspiring. While such descriptions were almost assuredly humorous in nature, ancient differences were less to do with actual doctrinal opinions than with maneuvering for adherents and influence.

Modern era 

The transformations of Islamic legal institutions in the modern era have had profound implications for the madhhab system. Legal practice in most of the Muslim world has come to be controlled by government policy and state law, so that the influence of the madhhabs beyond personal ritual practice depends on the status accorded to them within the national legal system. State law codification commonly utilized the methods of takhayyur (selection of rulings without restriction to a particular madhhab) and talfiq (combining parts of different rulings on the same question). Legal professionals trained in modern law schools have largely replaced traditional ulema as interpreters of the resulting laws. Global Islamic movements have at times drawn on different madhhabs and at other times placed greater focus on the scriptural sources rather than classical jurisprudence. The Hanbali school, with its particularly strict adherence to the Quran and hadith, has inspired conservative currents of direct scriptural interpretation by the Salafi and Wahhabi movements. In the 20th century many Islamic jurists began to assert their intellectual independence from traditional schools of jurisprudence. Examples of the latter approach include networks of Indonesian ulema and Islamic scholars residing in Muslim-minority countries, who have advanced liberal interpretations of Islamic law.

Schools

Generally, Sunnis have a single preferred madhhab from region to region, but also believe that ijtihad must be exercised by the contemporary scholars capable of doing so. Most rely on taqlid, or acceptance of religious rulings and epistemology from a higher religious authority in deferring meanings of analysis and derivation of legal practices instead of relying on subjective readings.

Experts and scholars of fiqh follow the usul (principles) of their own native madhhab, but they also study the usul, evidences, and opinions of other madhahib.

Sunni
Sunni schools of jurisprudence are each named after the classical jurist who taught them. The four primary Sunni schools are the Hanafi, Shafi'i, Maliki and Hanbali rites. The Zahiri school remains in existence but outside of the mainstream, while the Jariri, Laythi, Awza'i, and Thawri schools have become extinct.

The extant schools share most of their rulings, but differ on the particular practices which they may accept as authentic and the varying weights they give to analogical reason and pure reason.

Orthodox Sunni schools

Hanafi 
The Hanafi school was founded by Abu Hanifa an-Nu‘man. It is followed by Muslims in the Levant, Central Asia, Afghanistan, Pakistan, most of India, Bangladesh, Northern Egypt, Iraq and Turkey and the Balkans and by most of the Muslim communities of Russia and China. There are movements within this school such as Barelvis and Deobandi, which are concentrated in South Asia.

Maliki 
The Maliki school is based on the jurisprudence of Imam Malik ibn Anas. It has also been called "School of Medina" because the school was based in Medina and their community

It is followed by Muslims in Nigeria, Algeria, North Africa, West Africa, United Arab Emirates, Kuwait, in parts of Saudi Arabia and in Upper Egypt.

The most prominent country which adheres to Maliki fiqh is Mauritania.

The Murabitun World Movement follows this school as well. In the past, it was also followed in parts of Europe under Islamic rule, particularly Islamic Spain and the Emirate of Sicily.

One of today's scholars Hamza Yusuf is a prominent Maliki scholar, who is a student of Murabit al-Hajj from Mauritania

Shafi'i 
The Shafi'i school is based upon the jurisprudence of Imam Muhammad ibn Idris ash-Shafi'i. It is followed by Muslims in the Hejaz region of Saudi Arabia, Southern Egypt, Ethiopia, Eritrea, Indonesia, Malaysia, Jordan, Palestine, the Philippines, Singapore, Somalia, Sri Lanka, Thailand, Yemen, Kurdistan, and southern India (such as the Mappilas of Kerala and the Konkani Muslims). It is the official school followed by the governments of Brunei and Malaysia. The Shafi'i school is also large in Iraq and Syria.

Hanbali 
The Hanbali school is based on the jurisprudence of Imam Ahmad ibn Hanbal who had been a student of Imam al-Shafi.

It is followed by Muslims in Qatar, most of Saudi Arabia and minority communities in Syria and Iraq. There are movements that are highly influenced by Hanbali fiqh such as  Salafism and Wahhabism concentrated in Saudi Arabia.

Zahiri 
The Zahiri school was founded by Dawud al-Zahiri. It is followed by minority communities in Morocco and Pakistan. In the past, it was also followed by the majority of Muslims in Mesopotamia, Portugal, the Balearic Islands, North Africa and parts of Spain.

Shia

Ja'fari
Twelver Shia adhere to the Ja'fari theological school associated with Ja'far al-Sadiq. In this school, the time and space bound rulings of early jurists are taken more seriously, and the Ja'fari school uses the intellect instead of analogy when establishing Islamic laws, as opposed to common Sunni practice.

Subgroups
 Usulism: forms the overwhelming majority within the Twelver Shia denomination. They follow a Marja-i Taqlid on the subject of taqlid and fiqh. They are concentrated in Iran, Pakistan, Azerbaijan, India, Iraq, and Lebanon.
 Akhbarism: similar to Usulis, however reject ijtihad in favor of hadith. Concentrated in Bahrain.
 Shaykhism: an Islamic religious movement founded by Shaykh Ahmad in the early 19th century Qajar dynasty, Iran, now retaining a minority following in Iran and Iraq. It began from a combination of Sufi and Shia and Akhbari doctrines. In the mid 19th-century many Shaykhis converted to the Bábí and Baháʼí religions, which regard Shaykh Ahmad highly.

Ismaili
Ismaili Muslims follow their own school in the form of the Daim al-Islam, a book on the rulings of Islam. It describes manners and etiquette, including Ibadat in the light of guidance provided by the Ismaili Imams. The book emphasizes what importance Islam has given to manners and etiquette along with the worship of God, citing the traditions of the first four Imams of the Shi'a Ismaili Fatimid school of thought.

Subgroups
Nizari: the largest branch (95%) of Ismaili, they are the only Shia group to have their absolute temporal leader in the rank of Imamate, which is invested in the Aga Khan. Nizārī Ismailis believe that the successor-Imām to the Fatimid caliph Ma'ad al-Mustansir Billah was his elder son al-Nizār. While Nizārī belong to the Ja'fari jurisprudence, they adhere to the supremacy of "Kalam", in the interpretation of scripture, and believe in the temporal relativism of understanding, as opposed to fiqh (traditional legalism), which adheres to an absolutism approach to revelation.
Tāyyebī Mustā'līyyah: the Musta'ali group of Ismaili Muslims differ from the Nizāriyya in that they believe that the successor-Imām to the Fatimid caliph, al-Mustansir, was his younger son al-Mustaʻlī, who was made Caliph by the Fatimad Regent Al-Afdal Shahanshah. In contrast to the Nizaris, they accept the younger brother al-Mustaʻlī over Nizār as their Imam. The Bohras are an offshoot of the Taiyabi, which itself was an offshoot of the Musta'ali. The Taiyabi, supporting another offshoot of the Musta'ali, the Hafizi branch, split with the Musta'ali Fatimid, who recognized Al-Amir as their last Imam. The split was due to the Taiyabi believing that At-Tayyib Abi l-Qasim was the next rightful Imam after Al-Amir. The Hafizi themselves however considered Al-Hafiz as the next rightful Imam after Al-Amir. The Bohras believe that their 21st Imam, Taiyab abi al-Qasim, went into seclusion and established the offices of the Da'i al-Mutlaq (الداعي المطلق), Ma'zoon (مأذون) and Mukasir (مكاسر). The Bohras are the only surviving branch of the Musta'ali and themselves have split into the Dawoodi Bohra, Sulaimani, Alavi Bohra, and other smaller groups.

Zaidi
Zaidi Muslims also follow their own school in the form of the teachings of Zayd ibn Ali and Imam Abu Hanifa. In terms of law, the Zaidi school is quite similar to the Hanafi school from Sunni Islam. This is likely due to the general trend of Sunni resemblance within Zaidi beliefs. After the passing of Muhammad, Imam Jafar al-Sadiq, Imam Zayd ibn Ali, Imams Abu Hanifa and Imam Malik ibn Anas worked together in Al-Masjid an-Nabawi in Medina along with over 70 other leading jurists and scholars. Jafar al-Sadiq and Zayd ibn Ali did not themselves write any books. But their views are Hadiths in the books written by Imams Abu Hanifa and Imam Malik ibn Anas. Therefore, the Zaydis to this day and originally the Fatimids, used the Hanafi jurisprudence, as do most Sunnis.

Ibadi 
The Ibadi school of Islam is named after Abd-Allah ibn Ibadh, though he is not necessarily the main figure of the school in the eyes of its adherents. Ibadism is distinct from both Sunni and Shi'ite Islam not only in terms of its jurisprudence, but also its core beliefs.

Amman Message 

The Amman Message was a statement, signed in 2005 in Jordan by nearly 200 prominent Islamic jurists, which served as a "counter-fatwa" against a widespread use of takfir (excommunication) by jihadist groups to justify jihad against rulers of Muslim-majority countries. The Amman Message recognized eight legitimate schools of Islamic law and prohibited declarations of apostasy against them.
 Hanafi (Sunni)
 Maliki (Sunni)
 Shafi'i (Sunni)
 Hanbali (Sunni)
 Ja'fari (Shia) 
 Zaidiyyah (Shia)
 Ibadiyyah 
 Zahiriyah

The statement also asserted that fatwas can be issued only by properly trained muftis, thereby seeking to delegitimize fatwas issued by militants who lack the requisite qualifications.

See also 
 Sharia (Islamic law)
 Schools of Islamic theology
 Islamic schools and branches
 Fiqh
 Ikhtilaf
 Ijtihad
 Taqlid
 Verse of Obedience
 Uli al-amr

References

Notes

Citations

Sources

 
 Branon Wheeler, Applying the Canon in Islam: The Authorization and Maintenance of Interpretive Reasoning in Ḥanafī Scholarship, SUNY Press, 1996.

Further reading

External links

 
Islamic terminology
Arabic words and phrases in Sharia
Islamic jurisprudence
Islamic schools